Memory of Mankind on the Moon is a time capsule that is planned to go to the Moon on Astrobotic Technology's upcoming Peregrine lander. It is made in collaboration with Hungarian company Puli Space Technologies and Memory of Mankind.

References

Space
Peregrine Payloads